Ironville is an unincorporated community in Boyd County, Kentucky, United States, near the intersection of Kentucky Route 5 and Kentucky Route 766. Due to its proximity to Ashland, Ironville is often considered to be a part of Ashland, although officially it is separate from the city and serves as a suburb to the city. It shares its ZIP code with Ashland as well.

Ironville is a part of the Huntington-Ashland, WV-KY-OH, Metropolitan Statistical Area (MSA). As of the 2000 census, the MSA had a population of 288,649.

Demographics

Education 
Boyd County Public Schools

External links
Chamber of Commerce

References

Unincorporated communities in Boyd County, Kentucky
Unincorporated communities in Kentucky